Cornelius R. Parsons (May 22, 1842 in York, New York – January 30, 1901 in Rochester, New York) was Mayor of Rochester for seven consecutive two-year terms between 1876 and 1890.

He was the son of State Senator Thomas Parsons (1814–1873). He was a lumber mill co-owner. He was elected to City Council in 1867. He was a member of the New York State Assembly (Monroe Co., 2nd D.) in 1891. He was a member of the New York State Senate from 1892 until his death in 1901, sitting in the 115th, 116th (both 29th D.), 117th, 118th (both 28th D.), 119th, 120th, 121st, 122nd, 123rd and 124th New York State Legislatures (all six 43rd D.).

References

1842 births
Mayors of Rochester, New York
Republican Party New York (state) state senators
1901 deaths
Republican Party members of the New York State Assembly
19th-century American politicians